Édouard Jaguer (8 August 1924, Paris – Paris 9 May 2006) was a French poet and art critic linked with the surrealist movement including Maurice Blanchard, Laurence Iché, Régine Raufast, Robert Rius and Tita.

Revues
He was involved with many groups and revues including:
 La Main a la Plume
 La Revolution la Nuit
 le Surrealisme-Revolutionaire
 Rixes
 COBRA
 Phases
 Boa
 Il Gesto
 Salamande
 La Breche
 Aujourd'hui
 XXme Siecle
 Ellebore
 Les Deux Soeurs
 La Tour du Feu
 La Nef

Bibliography 
 La Poutre creuse (1950) - poetry
 La Nuit est faite pour ouvrir les portes (1955) - poetry
 Le Mur derrière le mur (1958) - poetry
 Regards obliques sur une histoire parallèle (1977) - poetry
 Les Mystères de la chambre noire (Flammarion, 1983) - surrealist photography
 Das Surrealistiche gedichte (German, 1985) - poetry anthology
 Le Surréalisme face à la littérature (Le Temps qu'il fait, Cognac, 1989)
 L’Excès dans la mesure (1995) - poetry
 Cobra au cœur du XXe siècle (Galilée, Paris 1997)
 L’Envers de la panoplie (Syllepse, "Libre espace", 2000) - poetry
 Monographies on Alechinsky, Baj, Cornell, Freddie, Gallizioli, Gironella, Jom, Lacomblez, Margonari, Perahim, Oelze, Pozzati, Remedios Varo and Revilla.

References

1924 births
2006 deaths
French male poets
20th-century French poets
20th-century French male writers